The Bandini 1000 P is a race car, built from 1959 until 1965 by Bandini Cars Forlì as a Prototype for future Formula Junior racing cars.

This construction marks a radical change in the philosophy of Bandini racing cars in having a rear-mounted engine and independent suspension. 

Build around the same engine as the late"Saponetta" 1000 cc it has a different approach for a good center of gravity. While the Saponetta had a "Front mid-engine position / Rear-wheel drive" with a very large hood and a solid rear axle very much like the larger contemporary "Ginetta G4", the 1000P is a true mid-engine Design. It has an all-new gearbox and differential and all "independent Suspension" with double wishbones which was very much state of the art that time, the same basic concept being used for Formula 1 racing cars.

The debut of the first prototype motor back in fact, dates back to 1959 to the circuit with engine Cesenatico 850 cc engine displacement (the first to use exclusively mergers Bandini) and the following year with the new engine 1000 cc which in 1962, reached the 98 HP at 8500 rpm.

It was a very successful car in hill-climbing and was eventually followed by the Bandini 1000 with which it has very much in common.

With the 1000 P an important novelty but also the return to the final four-wheel independent. The geometry of the rear suspension, tested on a copy of Formula Junior, is totally different from the first Bandini 1946, and was used for all types thereafter.

The chassis

The chassis, designed and built by Ilario Bandini, uses the same type of material as earlier (tubular steel space-frame, aluminium sheets), but the design allowed it to reach the incredible weight of only .

 Structure and material: frame of elliptical section tubes, special steel aeronautics derivation; patent No. 499843
 Suspension:
 Front: Independent, triangle wishbones overlapping with shock hydraulic telescopic tilted and springs cylindrical helical coaxial; stabilizer bar
 Rear: Independent, wishbones swinging and lower triangles on which the act shock hydraulic telescopic tilted and springs cylindrical helical coaxial, camber caster and Toe adjustable stabilizer bar

 Braking system:
 Service: hydraulics, drum front and rear disc request Amadori
 Steering:  worm
 Guide: left
 Wheels: Borrani Ray 15 "
 Tyres: 4.25x15 / 5.20x12 "
 Fuel tank: 
 Transmission: differential and gearbox to rear overthrown
 Weight bare chassis: 
 Weight total:  dry

Engine Bandini DOHC 1000

 Positioning: longitudinal rear, 4-cylinder in-line
 Materials and specifics: a mixed distribution: chain gears, double camshaft Head alloy, 8 valves, chamber burst hemisphere, block to five media bench unique fusion of aluminium, sump in aluminium, reeds of cylinders in ironcasted chrome and detachable
 Bore: 
 Stroke: 
 Displacement: 987 cc
 Compression ratio: 9,5:1
 Power: 2 Weber carburetors double body 38DCO3
 Power: 98 CV @ 8500 rpm
 Lubricate: Carter with wet gear pump and filter external cooler
 Cooling: forced liquid with centrifugal pump-driven belt and pulley, aluminum cooler on the front
 Gearbox and clutch: 4 speed transmission (the second third and fourth synchronized) + RG clutch single dry disc
 Ignition and electrical equipment: coil and distributor on the head, battery 12 V and generator

The body

The bodies of the aluminium two-seater (boat) are built in Forlì by Bandini.
Compared with Saponetta, which is the root note stylistic common, 1000P lines has more tense and aggressive front end with a very low profile and almost free variations in height.
The headlights arrears, the air-intake and squared prominent, give the impression of being faced with a car that will not wait long to give a demonstration of its capabilities.
The bonnet rear hull partly also the wheels, is equipped with large grids side as the fin rounded behind the driver. Folding forward, allows easy access to the engine compartment. The introduction of roll-bar will force a reversal of opening towards and this is also amended the design of bonnet. Disappears grids side and the upper fin and open two air-intakes on the area of advanced rear wheel, more height compared to centreplane. Even the front undergoes a harmonization with the rear, now, more rounded. Is reduced lengthwise (so more at the bottom) and enlarged the size of lights, so it has an air intake less square in shape. The slides covering the headlights are part of continuous lines of wheel, and the overall appearance is sweeter.

See also
 Ilario Bandini
 Bandini Cars

Bandini vehicles
Sports racing cars
1960s cars
Cars introduced in 1959